Shallow focus is a photographic and cinematographic technique incorporating a small depth of field. In shallow focus, one plane of the scene is in focus while the rest is out of focus. Shallow focus is typically used to emphasize one part of the image over another. Photographers sometimes refer to the aesthetic quality of the unfocused area(s) as bokeh.

The opposite of shallow focus is deep focus, in which the entire image is in focus.

Overview
Shallow focus has become more popular in the 2000s and 2010s. It is also a means by which low budget filmmakers use to hide places that would require expensive props. It is often proclaimed by some to being a way to avoid the "video look." Extremely shallow focus – sometimes called bokeh porn – made its debut in cinematography in 2008 with the release of the Canon EOS 5D Mark II and the start of DSLR cinematography.

Details 
The effect can be obtained by a larger aperture, a close viewpoint, a larger image sensor or a longer focal length lens from a smaller distance. A tilt lens can be used, in the opposite way to that used, to increase depth of focus.

There are even adapters that allow lenses from 35 mm cine cameras to be used on smaller film and digital formats.

Examples 

In the film The Rules of the Game (1939), a couple flirts in the foreground while the woman's husband enters the background.  Director Jean Renoir chose to keep the husband out-of-focus so that his presence is hinted, but not emphasized.

See also
 Bokeh
 Depth of field
 Portrait

References 

Photographic techniques
Cinematography